Gustav Sohon (1825–1903) was an American artist, interpreter, and topographical assistant.

Born in 1825 in Tilsit, East Prussia, Gustav Sohon immigrated to the United States in 1842 at the age of 17. In the early 1850s, he enlisted in the U.S. Army. Upon his enlistment he was stationed in the West, and eventually found his way to Fort Steilacoom. One of his first assignments was with Lieutenant John Mullan, who was surveying the country between the Rocky and Bitterroot Mountains for the Pacific Railroad Surveys railroad survey led by Isaac Stevens.

Sohon reaches the Northwest
From that moment on, Sohon witnessed and contributed to some of the most momentous events in the history of the Northwest. As an army private, he served with the Stevens railroad survey for over a year before his artistic ability came to the Governor's attention. Sohon proved to have a flair for linguistics, and was soon fluent in the Flathead and Pend d'Oreille languages. This skill enabled him to communicate with the Indians, and allowed him the opportunity to draw portraits of many of the most important Native American leaders. It is because of Sohon's easy way with native conversation that we can now witness his perspective of the past through the expressive images he created.

Sohon was also a talented painter, who produced accurate landscapes and vivid scenes from native life, including the first panoramic view of the Rocky Mountains and the earliest-known sketch of the Great Falls of the Missouri. He also recorded several of the treaty councils during his time with Stevens.

End of army life
Sohon's five-year enlistment ended in July 1857. He then sought out his earlier friend and mentor, Lieutenant John Mullan. Mullan was spearheading the construction of a military road from Walla Walla to Fort Benton, and Sohon surveyed routes and monitored the construction progress. In 1860 Sohon guided the first wagon party to cross the Rocky and Bitterroot Mountains to the Columbia Plateau by a route other than the more accustomed Overland Trail. When Mullan's Road was complete, Sohon accompanied him to Washington, DC, to assist in the preparation of topographical data, maps, and illustrations for a report on the road's construction. He never returned to the Northwest.

Marriage and family
In April 1863, Gustav Sohon and Julianna Groh were married. For a brief time they lived in San Francisco, where Sohon ran a photography studio. Several years later, they returned to Washington, DC, where Sohon disappeared from public life, running a shoe business and raising a large family with Julianna. He died on September 9, 1903.

Sohon's artistic abilities place him the same league with such other, better-known Western artists as George Catlin, Paul Kane, and Karl Bodmer. As an artist, Sohon was a product of his time and his depictions of treaty events reflect this. His drawings and watercolor paintings allow everyone who views them to see, through his eyes, the treaty councils between the United States Government and Indian tribes of the Pacific Northwest.

Notes

Sources
Buerge, David M. "Big Little Man: Isaac Stevens (1818-1861)," Washingtonians: A biographical Portrait of the State. Seattle: Sasquatch Books, 1988.
McDermott, Paul D. and Ronald E. Grim "The Artistic Views of Gustavus Sohon: Images of Colonel Wright's Campaign of 1858" Columbia: The Magazine of Northwest History, 2002, Vol. 16, No.2
Nicandri, David L. Northwest Chiefs: Gustav Sohon's View of the 1855 Stevens Treaty Councils. Tacoma: Washington State Historical Society, 1986.

External links

Washington State Historical Society—The Treaty Trail: U.S.-Indian Treaty Councils in the NorthwestGustav Sohon: Indian Pictorialist, Interpreter, and Topographical Assistant - 1825-1903
University of Idaho entry

German emigrants to the United States
19th-century American painters
American male painters
20th-century American painters
1825 births
1903 deaths
Explorers of Montana
19th-century American male artists
20th-century American male artists